Port of Civitavecchia, also known as "Port of Rome", or Civitavecchia Port of Rome, is the seaport of Civitavecchia, Metropolitan City of Rome, Italy. It is an important hub for the maritime transport in Italy, for goods and passengers. The Rome Cruise Terminal is part of the port. Part of the "Motorways of the Sea", it is linked to several Mediterranean ports and represents one of the main links between the  Italian mainland and Sardinia.

References

External links

  Port of Civitavecchia website
  with 3D reconstruction of roman Port of Centumcellae.

Civitavecchia
Metropolitan City of Rome Capital
Civitavecchia
Transport in Rome
Transport in Lazio